Hibiscadelphus hualalaiensis (Hualalai hau kuahiwi) is a species of flowering plant in the mallow family, Malvaceae, that is endemic to the Big Island of Hawaii. The last known plant died in 1992, making it most likely extinct in the wild; any remaining plants are threatened by habitat loss. Associated plants include ōhia lehua (Metrosideros polymorpha), lama (Diospyros sandwicensis), māmane (Sophora chrysophylla), naio (Myoporum sandwicense), ālaa (Pouteria sandwicensis), pāpala (Charpentiera spp.), aiea (Nothocestrum spp.), poolā (Claoxylon sandwicense), and Kikuyu Grass (Pennisetum clandestinum).

References

hualalaiensis
Endemic flora of Hawaii
Biota of Hawaii (island)
Trees of Hawaii
Plants extinct in the wild
Taxonomy articles created by Polbot